Walkerville  Victoria, Australia, is a tiny village on Waratah Bay in southwest Gippsland, about 190 km southeast of Melbourne. The small town, originally known as Waratah, is separated into Walkerville North and Walkerville South. The Walkerville Promontory View Estate is situated inland 2.3 km north of Walkerville North.

History
Walkerville is situated on the spectacular tribal lands of the Brataualung people, a clan of a wider regional grouping known as the Gunai/Kurnai nation.

The Post Office opened on 10 August 1885 and was known as Waratah Bay until 1892. It closed in 1972.

Its heyday was the early quarter of the 20th century, where commercial quantities of lime were bagged and exported to the booming capital city. Lime obtained from the site is said to have been used in the building of Melbourne's iconic Flinders Street station. 
Raw material was mined from the surrounding limestone cliffs, loaded into horse-drawn trams and hauled along above the high-tide line to be burned in one of six kilns. Much of the surrounding countryside was depleted from a combination of mining and timber-harvesting to fuel the kilns. Burned lime was bagged, then stacked in sheds. Lime was transported to Melbourne aboard a series of ships that stopped at the 300-metre jetty nearby. Operations continued until 1926, when shipping expenses made the product unprofitable.

At its peak, the township was home to eighty people, mostly workers at the six lime kilns.

The Walkerville Promontory View Estate was created in the sixties. The original purchase price of the blocks was 25 pounds.

In 2005, all that remained of the lime burning operations was the stonework from ruined buildings, ruins of several lime kilns and one wooden pile from the once imposing jetty at Walkerville South. There are several wooden piles remaining of the jetty at Diggers Island to the south.

The Town today

Walkerville South is accessed via the gravel Walkerville S road that ends at the Walkerville South Beach. The sheltered bay and sandy beach is frequented in the summer by families swimming, fishing and paddling in the quiet pristine waters. Walkerville South has a beach access ramp for launching small boats  which is closed to vehicles during busy periods.

Walkerville North is accessed by the sealed winding Walkerville road from the Walkerville Promontory View Estate through beautiful forest down to the shore. Once the road clears the forest at the shore the gravel Loop road on the immediate left goes through the Walkerville Foreshore Camping Reserve for 1km. The sealed Walkerville Road follows the shore closely for about 1.3 km, ending at ramp that provides access to a small beach where boats can be launched. There are some houses, small picnic areas, a small hall and public toilet along the road. The hall was relocated to its current location from the earlier township of Waratah (now Walkerville South).

Walkerville North provides beautiful views across Waratah Bay to nearby Wilsons Promontory, and at low tide provides access to spectacular rock pools.

A trail called the Limeburner's Walk,  climbs above a small section of cliffs to connect Walkerville North and Walkerville South. The trail starts approximately 100 metres past the end of the beach access ramp. The trail leads through forests and little creeks stained brown by tannin for tea tree (melaleuca) plants.  There are vantage points along the trail with information plaques about the brief mining and logging history of the settlement, and geographical information about the area. A short side-trail takes you to a hidden historic cemetery with headstones of the settlers and workers involved in the early period of limestone mining and lime production.

The 'Walkerville Foreshore Camping Reserve' at Walkerville North consists of a one kilometre stretch of dirt road behind the rocky beach with camping sites on either side. The camping ground is busiest during the Easter and New Year holidays. Within the foreshore camping reserve is Walky kiosk, the only shop in Walkerville.

The Walkerville Promontory View Estate has over 250 housing blocks, some of which have views across Waratah Bay. There is a CFA fire station in Panoramic Drive. The estate has no sewerage system or town water supply.

The town was the focus of the Weddings Parties Anything song Walkerville from their 1996  album River'esque.

References

External links
Sydney Morning Herald - Walkerville

Coastal towns in Victoria (Australia)
Fishing communities in Australia
Lime kilns in Australia
Towns in Victoria (Australia)
Shire of South Gippsland